Solitary Islands Way is a road in the Mid North Coast region of New South Wales, located north of the city of Coffs Harbour. It consists of a mix of newly constructed roads, pre-existing Council-owned roads and former sections of the highway that were bypassed by new alignments in 2013 and 2017.

Route description
Solitary Islands Way is a  road stretching from Korora just north of Coffs Harbour to Dirty Creek near Halfway Creek. The section between Korora and Woolgoolga runs largely parallel and adjacent to the Pacific Highway.

The following sections of the road were previously part of the Pacific Highway and were bypassed by new alignments:
between the southern end near Coachmans Close and Split Solitary Road at Korora
between Woopi Drive and Arrawarra interchange via Woolgoolga
between Tasman Street and Range Road interchange via Corindi Beach

Additionally, three sections of the road that were not previously Pacific Highway had other previous names:
Hoys Road: between Moonee Beach Road and south of Bucca Road at Moonee Beach
Graham Drive: between Emerald Heights Drive and Hearnes Lake Road at Sandy Beach
Eggins Drive: between Arrawarra Beach Road and Gateway Lifestyle Lorikeet Holiday Park access at Arrawarra

History
As part of the Pacific Highway Upgrade, the section between Coffs Harbour and Halfway Creek was progressively upgraded in the 2010s. The environmental assessment for the Sapphire to Woolgoolga upgrade of the highway in 2008 proposed a local access strategy, which involved the construction of new roads adjacent to the highway, using and upgrading existing Council-owned roads, or using the existing highway alignment as local access roads.

In February 2013, the Coffs Harbour City Council voted to name the new local access road as Solitary Islands Way. The Woolgoolga bypass of the highway opened to traffic on 16 December 2013, and the rest of the Sapphire to Woolgoolga upgrade was completed in July 2014. Solitary Islands Way was gazetted on 1 May 2014 as a  local access road based on the local access strategy proposed in 2008, and consisted of:
new roads parallel to the Pacific Highway, with some sections along former alignments of the highway
Hoys Road at Moonee Beach, upgraded and renamed to Solitary Islands Way
Graham Drive at Sandy Beach, renamed to Solitary Islands Way
bypassed section of the highway within Woolgoolga, including a section of Clarence Street
former alignment of the highway south of Split Solitary Road at Sapphire Beach

In October 2017, the Pacific Highway was bypassed between Arrawarra and Dirty Creek (Range Road) via Corindi Beach, as part of the Woolgoolga to Halfway Creek upgrade. The bypassed section of the highway and the existing Eggins Drive at Arrawarra were renamed Solitary Islands Way on 22 December 2017, extending the road northwards from Arrawarra to Dirty Creek.

In October 2020, Coffs Harbour City Council approved Woolgoolga's first set of traffic lights at the intersection of Solitary Islands Way and Centenary Drive, near Woolgoolga High School and the planned West Woolgoolga Sports Complex. The cost of the signalised intersection is estimated to be 5.26 million. Construction is expected to begin in the second half of 2021.

Major junction list

See also
Big River Way - bypassed section of Pacific Highway and the site of the Grafton bus crash
Macleay Valley Way - bypassed section of Pacific Highway and the site of the Kempsey bus crash
Giinagay Way - bypassed section of Pacific Highway at Nambucca Heads and Urunga

External links
Map of the Sapphire to Woolgoolga upgrade

References

 Roads in New South Wales